The 2010 Dr McKenna Cup was a Gaelic football competition played under the auspices of Ulster GAA. The tournament was won by Donegal. They defeated Tyrone in the final. Tyrone's Stephen O'Neill dislocated his elbow in the final.

See also
 2010 O'Byrne Cup
 2010 McGrath Cup

References

External links
 Antrim's McKenna Cup squad

Dr McKenna Cup
Dr McKenna Cup
Dr McKenna Cup seasons